Stephen Barrett (born 1933) is an American psychiatrist and author.

Stephen Barrett may also refer to:
Stephen Barrett (classics teacher) (1718–1801), British classics teacher who wrote some published translations of Latin texts
Stephen Barrett (Irish politician) (1913–1976), Irish Fine Gael politician, barrister and judge
Stephen Barrett (diplomat) (born 1931), British ambassador
Stephen Barrett (cyclist) (born 1985), Irish track cyclist

See also
Steve Barratt, Coronation Street character